Rabbi Eliyahu Essas (Ilya Tsvievich Essas; born 1946) is a former leader of Soviet Jewry and one of the founders of Baal Teshuva movement in the Soviet Union. He lives in Jerusalem. Essas became interested in Human Rights and Jewish cause, while studying Mathematics in Vilnius University.

Refusenik 
In 1973. he applied to the Soviet authorities to make Aliyah to Israel. He was refused on the grounds of his wife having a security sensitive job.

While living in Moscow, Essas spent his time building an Orthodox Jewish Community. He created a network of Torah studies, children underground education and summer camps.

In January 1986, after political deals between Edgar Bronfman, Chairman of the World Jewish Congress, and the Soviet authorities, Essas' family moved to Israel.

Later activity 
In 1988, Essas stood for election to the Knesset with the Degel HaTorah party.

Since 1999, Rabbi Essas works for Aish Hatorah in Jerusalem and is a founder of the Jewish Russian website evrey.com

Bibliography 
 Zakon, Miriam Stark, Silent Revolution - Story of Rabbi Eliyahu Essas and Russian Torah Network (Artscroll/Mesorah, 1992) 
 Learn Torah, Love Torah, Live Torah: Harav Mordechai Pinchos Teitz, the Quintessential Rabbi, by Rivkah Teitz Blau, Chap. 13 (Ktav 2001)

External links 
 Rabbi Essas' website

1946 births
Living people
Politicians from Vilnius
Israeli Orthodox rabbis
Soviet dissidents
Soviet rabbis
Refuseniks
20th-century Lithuanian rabbis
21st-century rabbis in Jerusalem
Rabbis from Vilnius
Soviet emigrants to Israel